John Richard Bernard (7 December 1938 – 23 February 1998) was an English cricketer. He played first-class cricket for Gloucestershire between 1956 and 1961 and for Cambridge University between 1958 and 1960. His final first-class match was in 1964.

A hard-hitting middle-order batsman and medium-pace bowler, Richard Bernard was a promising cricketer at Clifton College. He went up to St John's College, Cambridge, and had his longest and most successful first-class season in 1959, when he played 24 matches for Cambridge University and Gloucestershire, scoring 822 runs at an average of 22.83 and taking 25 rather expensive wickets at an average of 49.28. He made his only century that season in Cambridge's match against Free Foresters, when he went to the wicket in the first innings with the score at 142 for 6 and was 119 not out when Cambridge were all out for 316. 

He worked as a family doctor in Bristol. He was the great-grandson of E. M. Grace.

References

External links

1938 births
1998 deaths
People educated at Clifton College
Alumni of St John's College, Cambridge
English cricketers
Gloucestershire cricketers
Cricketers from Bristol
Cambridge University cricketers
Marylebone Cricket Club cricketers
Free Foresters cricketers
20th-century English medical doctors
L. C. Stevens' XI cricketers